Mahendra Multiple Campus, Dharan (more colloquially : M. M. Campus) is a public co-educational institution located in the Central part of the Dharan city and is one of the largest campuses affiliated to the Tribhuvan University. The institution offers undergraduate and graduate (masters) programs.  The campus is named after late king Mahendra .

Programs
The undergraduate is the most popular program with bachelors and intermediate level, however, the later has been scrapped from the academic session of 2010. The post graduate level comprises Masters and Doctorate programs. Four different faculties are identified: Law, Humanities, Education, and Management.

References

Tribhuvan University